Janki Devi Memorial College (JDMC) is one of the women's colleges of University of Delhi. The college is near the Karol Bagh Metro Station.

History
The college was established in the year 1959 by Shri Brij Krishna Chandiwala in the memory of his mother Smt. Janki Devi.

Programmes
Under the aegis of University of Delhi the college offers various undergraduate, postgraduate and short-term courses. Theses are :

Undergraduate
 Bachelor of Arts (B.A) Programme
 Bachelor of Arts (B.A) Hons.
 Bachelor of Commerce (B.Com.) Programme
 Bachelor of Commerce (B.Com.) Hons.
 Bachelor of Economics (ECO) Hons.
Bachelor of Science (B.Sc.) Hons.
Bachelor of Education (B.Ed.)
Bachelor of Fine Arts (BFA)

Postgraduate
 Master of Arts (M.A)
 Master of Commerce (M.Com.)

Short-term courses
 English language Proficiency Courses (ELPC)
 Spanish Language Certificate Course (SLCC)

Notable alumni

External links

Delhi University
1959 establishments in Delhi
Women's universities and colleges in Delhi
Educational institutions established in 1959